Khalil Allah II Ali was the 39th imam of the Qasim-Shahi branch of the Nizari Isma'ili community.

Khalil Allah II Ali succeeded his father Nur al-Dahr Ali when the latter died in 1671, until his own death in January 1680. He was buried in a tomb in the mausoleum of his predecessor, al-Mustansir Billah III. Khalil Allah II Ali was the last Nizari imam to reside in Anjudan; his successor Shah Nizar II moved his residence to the nearby village of Kahak.

References

Sources

 

17th-century births
1680 deaths
Nizari imams
17th-century Iranian people
Iranian Ismailis
17th-century Ismailis
17th-century Islamic religious leaders
People from Markazi Province